Ouled Tebben is a town and commune in Setif Province in north-eastern Algeria. It is located in the Hodna Mountains.

The city contains is an Arab tribe from the Ayad, a branch of the Banu Hilal.

References

Communes of Sétif Province
Cities in Algeria
Algeria